Potager ( foaled 4 February 2017) is a Japanese Thoroughbred racehorse. In his first two seasons he showed promise by winning four minor races but was not tested in the highest class. As a four-year-old in 2021 he won the Listed Shirafuji Stakes and was place three times in Graded stakes races. He improved again in 2022 when he recorded an upset win in the Grade 1 Osaka Hai.

Background
Potager is a dark bay horse with a faint white star and white socks on his hind feet bred in Japan by Northern Farm. In July 2018 he was entered in the JRA Sale of Yearlings and was bought for ¥205,200,000 by Makoto Kaneko. He was sent into training with Yasuo Tomomichi.

He was from the tenth crop of foals sired by Deep Impact, who was the Japanese Horse of the Year in 2005 and 2006, winning races including the Tokyo Yushun, Tenno Sho, Arima Kinen and Japan Cup. Deep Impact's other progeny include Gentildonna, Harp Star, Kizuna, A Shin Hikari, Snowfall and Saxon Warrior. Potager's dam Ginger Punch was a Florida-bred mare who was an outstanding performer in North America, winning 12 races including the Breeders' Cup Distaff and being voted American Champion Older Female Horse in 2007. As a female-line descendant of the British broodmare Dulcimer she was distantly related to Honeylight, Crepello, Twilight Alley and Attica Meli. She was exported to Japan at the end of her racing career where she also produced the Mainichi Okan winner Rouge Buck.

Racing career

2019: two-year-old season
On his racecourse debut Potager started the 0.3/1 favourite in a contest for previously unraced two-year-olds over 1800 metres on firm ground at Nakayama Racecourse on 29 September. Ridden by Yuga Kawada he settled towards the rear of the fourteen-runner field in the early stages before moving up on the outside on the final turn and took the lead 100 metres from the finish to win by a length. In November the colt started favourite for the Kigiku Sho over 2000 metres at Kyoto Racecourse but was beaten a nose into second place by Simple Game.

2020: three-year-old season
Potager began his second season in the Listed Principal Stakes over 2000 metres at Tokyo Racecourse on 9 May when he was beaten a neck into second place by Bitterender. He ran second again in June, beaten one and three quarter lengths by Al Satwa when starting odds on favourite for a minor race over 2000 metres at Hanshin Racecourse. Over the same course and distance on 4 July Potager was matched against older horses in the Ikuta Tokubetsu on soft ground and started the 0.4/1 favourite. Ridden by Kawada he raced in third place before taking the lead early in the straight and repelled a sustained challenge from the five-year-old Peptide Orchid to win by one and a quarter lengths. The colt then started 0.9/1 favourite the Seibunikkan Sports Hai over 2000 metres at Kokura Racecourse on 15 August. With Kawada again in the saddle he settled behind the leaders before taking the lead on the final turn and kept on well to win by a length and a quarter from Blooming Sky. After a three-month break Potager returned to the track for the Kishiwada Stakes over 2000 metres at Hanshin on 14 November and went off at odds of 0.3/1 in a nine-runner field. After being settled in fourth place by Kawada he produced a sustained run on the outside in the straight, overhauled the front-runnon five-year-old Danon Majesty in the final strides and won by neck.

2021: four-year-old season
On 30 January 2021, Potager began his third campaign with a step up in class for the Listed Shirafuji Stakes over 2000 metres at Tokyo where he was ridden by Kawada and started the 1/1 favourite. He raced just behind the leaders as Atomic Force set the pace but lost his position approaching the final turn. He began to make good progress in the straight, gained the advantage in the last 100 metres and prevailed in a tight finish, beating the fast-finishing Sanrei Pocket by a neck with Franz and African Gold close behind in third and fourth. For the rest of the season, Potager was campaigned in Graded stakes races and ran consistently well although he failed to record another win. In the Grade 2 Kinko Sho at Chukyo in March he finished a close third behind Gibeon and Daring Tact with Glory Vase in third. In May he started favourite for the Grade 3 Niigata Daishoten but was beaten a neck into second by Sanrei Pocket.

After a summer break Potager returned for the Grade 2 Mainichi Okan over 1800 metres at Tokyo on 10 October and came home third behind Schnell Meister and Danon Kingly beaten a head and one and a half lengths by the first two. Three weeks later the colt was stepped up to Grade 1 class for the autumn edition of the Tenno Sho and started at odds of 22.3/1. He tracked the leaders for most of the way before being outpaced in the closing stages and finished sixth behind Efforia, beaten five lengths by the winner.

2022: five-year-old season

Potager began his fourth season on 23 January when he finished fifth to King of Koji in the Grade 2 American Jockey Club Cup at Nakayama, beaten just over two lengths by the winner. In March at Chukyo he produced another respectable effort in defeat as he came home fourth behind Jack d'Or in Kinko Sho. Hayato Yoshida took the ride when Potager returned to Grade 1 class for the Osaka Hai over 2000 metres at Hanshin on 3 April and started a 58/1 outsider in a sixteen-runner field. Efforia started favourite while the other contenders included Lei Papale, Akai Ito, Makahiki, Jack d'Or and King of Koji. Potager settled in fifth place as Jack d'Or set the pace, before moving up on the final turn and making a sustained run in the straight. Lei Papale went to the front 200 metres from the finish but Potager maintained his progress, gained the advantage in the final strides and won by a neck from Arrivo, with Lei Papale a nose away in third place. After the race Yoshida commented "Potager adapts well to various race developments and he was terrific in that he was able to keep up with the pace of the other really strong horses in front. He really gave his all in the end and all I could do was keep urging him on so I’m happy that we were able to win."

Potager was off the track until 26 June when he started at odds of 21.9/1 for the 2200 metre Takarazuka Kinen at Hanshin. He raced in mid-division for most of the way but failed to make any progress in the straight and came home eleventh of the seventeen runners behind Titleholder.

Pedigree

References

2017 racehorse births
Racehorses bred in Japan
Racehorses trained in Japan
Thoroughbred family 16-d